Satwant Kaur is an Indian film  and television actress who works in Punjabi and Hindi films. She started her career through Punjabi music videos, television soap operas and telefilms in the earlier days and ended up appearing in the films. She is known for her portrayals in movies like Ik Jind Ik Jaan (2006), Singh Is Kinng (2008), Majaajan (2008),  Ardaas (2016), Dev D (2009), Udta Punjab (2016), TV Serial Kach Diyan Wanga and Gurdas Maan's video song Pind Dian Galian etc., along with many others.

Family background
Kaur was born into a  Punjabi Sikh family in Sirsa, Haryana, India. Her father name was Gurdayal Singh and mother name was Mukhtiar Kaur. She completed her education in Sirsa. She married Tarsem Singh in 1989, her husband has always supported her to pursue her acting career. Family is settled in Mohali and have two children.

Early career
She made her debut with appearing in a music video Akhan Billian Gallan Di Gori by Singer Mikki Singh in 1997. She starred in many other videos but Gurdas Maan's Pind Dian Galian song helped her in gaining fame.

Film and television career
In 2006, Kaur played a role in Ik Jind Ik Jaan, where she was portrayed as Nagma's mother. Then she appeared in many Punjabi and Hindi movies like Singh Is Kinng, Dev D, Udta Punjab, Rabb Da Radio, Waris Shah: Ishq Daa Waaris, Dil Apna Punjabi, Tere Naal Love Ho Gaya, Kaafila. She has starred in about 34 movies including 8 Bollywood movies. She is busy in few upcoming movie projects.

Filmography

Films

Television serials

Telefilms

References

External links 
 

Actresses from Punjab, India
1968 births
Living people